Alexandra Lehti (born 22 March 1996), better known by her stage name Lxandra, is a Finnish pop singer and songwriter. Raised in Suomenlinna, she is a daughter of journalist Baba Lybeck and musician , and presently resides in Berlin. Lxandra is a Swedish-speaking Finn.

In the final, she finished in sixth place with 70 points (24 points from the televote and 46 points from the juries).

Albums 
 Another Lesson Learned (2019)
 Careful What I Dream Of (2021)

References 

Finnish women singer-songwriters
Living people
21st-century Finnish women singers
Singers from Helsinki
1996 births
Finnish expatriates in Germany
Swedish-speaking Finns